MilkShape 3D (MS3D) is a shareware low-polygon 3D modeling program created by Mete Ciragan. It is used mainly for compiling models for Half-Life, Blockland, The Sims 2, The Sims 3, Rock Raiders, and other sandbox video games. It is also used to create models for a large number of indie games, Milkshape 3D's repertoire of export capabilities has been extended considerably, due to the efforts of both its creator and the community around it, and it is now able to be used for most games today, so long as an exporter for the required format is available.

History 
MilkShape 3D was created by chUmbaLum sOft, a small software company in Zurich, Switzerland, which was established in the autumn of 1996. chUmbaLum sOft develops 3D tools for games and other applications. MilkShape 3D was originally created as a low poly modelling program by Mete Ciragan for the GoldSrc engine. Over time many features were added as were many export formats. Though not as advanced as other leading 3D modelling programs, it remains a simple and cost-effective tool for creating 3D models.

Features 
MilkShape 3D has all basic operations like select, move, rotate, scale, extrude, turn edge, subdivide, among many others. MilkShape 3D also allows low-level editing with the vertex and face tool. Standard and extended primitives such as spheres, boxes, and cylinders are available. Milkshape 3D can export to over 70 file formats.

MilkShape 3D is a skeletal animator. As well as supporting its own file-format, Milkshape 3D is able to export to morph target animation like the ones in the Quake model formats or to export to skeletal animations like Half-Life, Genesis3D, Unreal, etc. The number of file types that the program can support features all major 3D game engines, including Source, Unreal, id Tech and LithTech. It has become known as a useful converter from one format to another.

Controversy 
Versions of MilkShape 3D prior to 1.8.1 Beta 1 allegedly contained code which caused itself to shutdown if it detected certain other programs running on the computer, such as Registry Monitor. Versions older than 1.6.5 (April 2003) would go so far as to shut down the offending program and prevent it from being run again while MilkShape 3D was still running. This behavior was removed shortly after it had been discovered. Ostensibly, this was to prevent users from figuring out how to edit the Windows registry to commit software cracking and use MilkShape 3D without paying for it. However, there was no End User License Agreement until version 1.8.1, which authorized the program to do this. Some users have therefore accused MilkShape 3D of being spyware and have boycotted it as a result.  These issues have been resolved since version 1.8.1 Beta 2 (May 2007).

See also 
 Blender
 OGRE Engine
 3D computer graphics software
 gmax

References

External links 
 The Official MS3D Web Site
 Official MS3D Download
 File format specification of the ms3d format
 An MS3D viewer written in C++, complete with animation and weighted vertices for the latest file format
 An MS3D loader written in C++
 Milkshape tutorial for Video game Makers
 Blender add-on to import and export ms3d files

Animation software